Malika Domrane (born 12 March 1956 in Tizi Hibel) is an Algerian singer, originally from Kabylie.

Life
Domrane began to sing in her high school choir in Tizi Ouzou. In 1969 she won a gold medal at festival in Algeria. After graduating as a nurse, she began work in a hospital but soon decided to dedicate herself professionally to singing, in defiance of the customs of her family and village.

In 1979, she went to France to release her first album, Tsuha, her first great success. She later published several albums, with songs typified by feminist cultural and the linguistic demands of the Berber. From 1994, she decided to live in France with her family.

Albums 
 Tsuha (1979)
 Thayriw Themouth (1981)
 NostAlgérie (1998, Arcade Records: 59 '38')
 Asaru (2001) (Blue Silver Records)

References

1956 births
Algerian emigrants to France
Algerian Berber feminists
Living people
Kabyle people
20th-century Algerian women singers
21st-century French women singers